The Paulian Association is a Roman Catholic organisation founded in 1956 by Roy Boylan in Sydney, Australia. Roy was influenced by Joseph Cardijn, the founder of Young Christian Workers and his model of "see, judge, act".

Paulian groups were set up in parishes throughout Australia. The activities of the association focused on youth, families, solo parents, aboriginal affairs, development, refugees and social justice.

In 1961, the Paulian Association established PALMS (now Palms Australia) which prepared and sent laity to work as volunteers in developing countries. The work was predominantly in education, trades and health, although now includes many other professions. Palms Australia became the largest of the Paulian programs and continues to send volunteers from Australia to the Pacific, Asia and Africa.

In 1963 the Paulian Association, in conjunction with the Christian Life Movement of South Australia began Project Compassion, a Lenten appeal, which has since become the major fundraising source of charity in Australia.

References 

Catholic lay organisations